The 4th Annual Bengal Film Journalists' Association Awards
were held on 1941, honoring the best in
India cinema in 1940.

Best India Film 
Woman

Best Bengali Film 
Doctor

Best Hindi Film 
Woman

Best Foreign Film 
 - Gone With The Wind

References 

Bengal Film Journalists' Association Awards
1941 film awards
1941 in Indian cinema